Mustafa Eskihellaç (born 5 May 1997) is a Turkish professional footballer who plays as a left midfielder for Gaziantep.

Professional career
On 18 January 2018, Mustafa signed for Yeni Malatyaspor from Düzyurtspor after successful seasons in the TFF Third League. He made his professional debut with Malatyaspor in a 1-1 Süper Lig tie with Kasımpaşa S.K. on 9 February 2018.

On the last day of the January transfermarket 2019, Eskihellaç was one of 22 players in two hours who signed for Turkish club Elazığspor. It had been placed under a transfer embargo but managed to negotiate it with the Turkish FA, leading to them going on a mad spree of signing and registering a load of players despite not even having a permanent manager in place. In just two hours, they managed to snap up a record 22 players - 12 coming in on permanent contracts and a further 10 joining on loan deals until the end of the season. He arrived on a loan for the rest of the season.

On 23 July 2022, Eskihellaç signed a three-year contract with Gaziantep.

International career
Mustafa represented the Turkey U20 at the 2018 Toulon Tournament.

References

External links
 
 
 

1997 births
Living people
Sportspeople from Trabzon
Turkish footballers
Turkey youth international footballers
Yeni Malatyaspor footballers
Elazığspor footballers
Boluspor footballers
Gaziantep F.K. footballers
TFF Third League players
Süper Lig players
TFF First League players
Association football midfielders